Trondhjem Biological Station is a marine biological research facility at the Norwegian University of Science and Technology. It is located by the Trondheimsfjord in Byneset, west of the city centre of Trondheim.

It was founded in 1900. It was directly subordinate to the Norwegian national government for the first fifty years of existence, and from 1951 to 1984 it belonged to the Royal Norwegian Society of Sciences and Letters Museum.

References

Norwegian University of Science and Technology
1900 establishments in Norway
Marine biological stations